Netball at the 2001 South Pacific Mini Games in Kingston, Norfolk Island was held during December 2001.

Preliminary round

Pool A

Pool B

Placement matches

7th/8th match

5th/6th match

Bronze medal match

Gold Medal match

Final standings

See also
 Netball at the Pacific Mini Games

References

 PNG Netball Results & Tournaments since 1991 PNG. Papua New Guinea netball webpage

Pacific Mini Games
2001 Pacific Games
Netball at the Pacific Games